Hong Gein-Sub (born October 14, 1985) is a South Korean football player.

References

1985 births
Living people
South Korean footballers
South Korean expatriate footballers
Jeonbuk Hyundai Motors players
Seongnam FC players
K League 1 players
China League One players
South Korean expatriate sportspeople in China
Expatriate footballers in China
Yanbian Funde F.C. players
Association football forwards
Sportspeople from Jeju Province